The Shiners' Wars were violent outbreaks in Bytown (now Ottawa) from 1835 to 1845 between Irish-Catholic immigrants, led by Peter Aylen, and French Canadians, led by Joseph Montferrand.

The war began when Aylen, a major Irish timber operator, organized a group of Irishmen to attack other timber operations—this group was known as the "Shiners." The Shiners attacked French-Canadian timber rafts and the town's political institutions, as well as brawling French Canadians on the streets.

In an attempt to control the violence, the citizens of Bytown created the Association of the Preservation of the Public Peace in Bytown, which included armed patrols; however, the violence continued. In the spring of 1837, the violence was brought under control after the government deployed troops to arrest the Shiners. Occasional violence still occurred until 1845 by groups claiming to be the Shiners.

Overview
In 1832, the Rideau Canal had just been constructed, thus leaving many Irishmen who worked on the canal out of work. To add, the lumber industry was dominated by French Canadians and, at the time, the Irish were considered to be at the lowest rung of the social ladder due to historical antipathy and their refusal to assimilate. These now-unemployed Irish lumbermen moved to the Bytown area (now Ottawa Valley), where they began to displace the area's French timber workers.

Peter Aylen, a major Irish timber operator, was sympathetic to these Irishmen, gaining him their allegiance. He would organize a gang of Irish supporters—calling them the "Shiners"—to attack other timber operations. Aylen personally gained an advantage from this violence (which was primarily in the form of brawling) as it disrupted his competitors.

The Shiners were accused of such crimes as assault, arson, rape, and murder. On one occasion, the pregnant wife of a farmer, who had upset the Shiners somehow, was attacked while driving home in a sleigh with other female family members. Beaten with sticks, the farmer's wife attempted to jump to safety, but her clothing got caught in the sleigh and she was dragged over the frozen ground before coming free. The Shiners cut her horses loose from the sleigh, running them off. The horses managed to find their way home the next day; their ears and tails had been mutilated. Other actions attributed to the Shiners' campaign of terror included stripping children naked in the snow, polluting wells, accosting women in the street, and shattering windows. On one occasion, they reportedly broke up a funeral procession and threw the coffin off of the hearse into the street.

1835–36 
In 1835, Shiners began interdicting timber rafts owned by French Canadians going down the Ottawa River to Montreal.

More than just gaining the lumber industry, Aylen set his sights to taking over Bytown. Aylen ordered his Irish supporters to attack the French Canadian and drive them out of the area, thus guaranteeing jobs and high wages to the Irish, especially the Shiners. Though special constables were assigned as peacekeepers, they either looked the other way or were on Aylen's payroll. Even if pursued, all that the hooligans would have to do was cross the border into Lower Canada, where they would evade arrest. As there was no jail or courthouse in Bytown, those who were captured had to be transported to Perth, Ontario, for trial; however, poorly-paid officers were reluctant to make the 50-mile trip given the great chance of being ambushed along the way.

The Irishmen also controlled the Union Bridge at Chaudière Falls, where lumberman Joseph Montferrand was ambushed and supposedly fought off over 150 Shiners. This event would be one of many examples of Montferrand's tough defense of French rights, making him the natural leader of the French Canadians against Aylen's Irishmen.

In August 1835, Bathurst District Agricultural Society's one-dollar membership fee allowed Aylen and his Shiners to overwhelm authentic members, after which they would vote in Aylen and his friends as directors. This, however, would be one step too far. On 20 October that year, a group of prominent Bytown citizens formed the Association of the Preservation of the Public Peace and appealed to town magistrates for 100 guns in order to arm citizens. To combat the Shiners, the town formed a volunteer force called the Bytown Rifles. Unfortunately, the Rifles would quickly disintegrate as nobody was willing to serve under its disciplinarian commander, Captain Baker. In an attempt to control the violence and keep the peace, vigilantes made nightly patrols. While these vigilantes had some success in maintaining order, the Shiners continued to terrorize the citizens of Bytown.

In March 1836, the leading lumbermen of the town founded the Ottawa Lumber Association as an additional step in suppressing violence in their industry. With Aylen as one of its officers, however, the first act of the new organization was “to improve the movement of timber” on the Madawaska River where Aylen had operations, which likely meant protecting Aylen's timber interests from upset French Canadians.

1837 
The violence would peak in 1837, when the area saw the highest annual Irish immigration to date, and during a time of financial crisis, rising prices, and increased unemployment in the lumber camps.

In early January 1837, Aylen and his cronies disrupted the election of councillors to the Nepean Township Council, held in Bytown at John Stanley's Tavern. Aylen was elected as one of the three councillors. Nonetheless, he demanded that the other two positions be filled with his men as well, so a gang of 40 to 60 of his men stormed the meeting room. As result, several of Aylen's opponents, including James Johnson—who founded Bytown's first newspaper, the Bytown Independent and Farmer’s Advocate—were violently beaten with sticks and horse whips in both the meeting room and the Tavern's courtyard. The meeting ended with legitimate attendees fleeing, as well as having the provincial statutes and other important papers destroyed. Order would only be restored by intervention of the military.

Ten days after the incident, an official inquiry into the riot was held by 4 Bytown magistrates. Most of the 12 or so witnesses who testified blamed Aylen for the affair; Aylen and his men did not testify. Concluding that intense measures were necessary in order to prevent such breach of the peace from occurring again, the magistrates recommended the establishment of a municipal police force as well as the building of a courthouse and jail in Bytown.

In early March 1837, armed men went to the house of James Johnson, who had been beaten in the January riot, on the pretense of searching for a man. Shots were fired into the upstairs rooms, but nobody was hurt. Only a short time later, Johnson was ambushed on Sappers’ bridge by three assailants armed with guns and whips. The assailants nearly succeeded, but Johnson managed to jump into deep snow to save himself. This time, Shiners were not able to act with impunity: the three men who committed this act were captured and taken to Perth to stand trial. Aylen did break them out of jail, but they were subsequently recaptured in late 1837 and served 3 years with hard labour in a penitentiary for attempted murder.

End to the violence 
By this time, Bytown citizens themselves were becoming better organized. Aylen, who had been charged with a number of offences over the years without any apparent consequence, either sold or rented out his properties on the Upper Canada side of the Ottawa River, and moved to Aylmer in Lower Canada, where he continued in the lumber business and apparently became a respected member of the community. He died in 1868.

Occasional violence still occurred by groups claiming to be the Shiners until 1845. Nonetheless, while the terrorism continued into the late 1840s, the Shiners began to fade without Peter Aylen to lead them.

Shiners
It is unknown how the name "Shiners" was given to Irish Catholics of the region. Some possibilities exist:
A derivation of the French word "chêneur," meaning cutter of oak trees,
A self-designation to "shine" above others, or
The new, "shiny" coins that they were paid in.

In popular culture 
In 2018, a graphic novel, The Shiners' War, was published in Ottawa. The story, written by Conor Ryan and illustrated by Shawn Daley, follows two fictional characters through the conflicts of the era, and features figures of the time within the plot, including Joseph Montferrand and Peter Aylen.

References

Further reading 
 Lanigan, Richard. 1888. They Two or Phases Of Life In Eastern Canada Fifty Years Ago.

History of Ottawa
Pre-Confederation Ontario
Conflicts in 1835
Irish diaspora in British North America
Irish-Canadian culture in Ontario
French Canada
Ethnic conflicts in Canada
Natural resource conflicts
19th-century conflicts
Timber industry in Canada
Upper Canada
Gangs in Ontario
Labour disputes in Ontario
Anti-ethnic activities in Canada
Violence in Canada